The Poudre Canyon is a narrow verdant canyon, approximately 40 miles (64 km) long, on the upper Cache la Poudre River (called the "Poudre" for short, which locals pronounce as "Pooder") in Larimer County, Colorado in the United States. The canyon is a glacier-formed valley through the foothills of the Front Range of the Rocky Mountains northwest of Fort Collins.

Description

Except for the small upper portion of the canyon north of Rocky Mountain National Park, State Highway 14 runs through the canyon. The route of the highway provides the principal vehicle access to the canyon and furnishes a road link between Fort Collins and North Park on the western side of Cameron Pass, which is accessible from the upper canyon. Most of the canyon is within the Canyon Lakes Ranger District of the Roosevelt National Forest, which is headquartered in nearby Fort Collins.

The flanks of the canyon wall are gently sloping and forested along most of its length, with the exception of several "narrows", at which the river has carved through recent formations leaving behind large glacial debris. The canyon is inhabited along most of its length downstream from Kinikinik. All of the communities in the canyon are unincorporated. Most of the habitation is the form of small cabins, some of which are inhabited only during season. Resort cabin communities for fishing and hunting are found sporadically along the canyon downstream from Rustic, which at one time in the late 19th century was a bustling summer resort, and burned down in 2008. The relative isolation of the canyon compared to ones further south along the Colorado Front Range gives a tranquil atmosphere with only small-scale tourist enterprises. The canyon is distinctly less developed than the Big Thompson Canyon west of Loveland. The commercial establishments, notably in Poudre Park, cater mostly to local clientele except during the fishing and whitewater rafting season, when the canyon receives a modest number of regional and national visitors.  Colorado State University operates a small campus in the mountains at Pingree Park, which is named for George Pingree, an early settler in the canyon in the 19th century.  Near Pingree Park is Sky Ranch Lutheran Camp, a summer camp affiliated with the Evangelical Lutheran Church in America.

The national forest in the vicinity of the canyon is laced with numerous trails that follow side gulches into the surrounding mountains. The trails serve double seasonal duty, as hiking trails in the summer and as cross-country skiing trails in the winter. One such trailhead at Long Draw Reservoir leads over La Poudre Pass along the Never Summer Mountains to the headwaters of the Colorado River in Rocky Mountain National Park.

The most popular species for fishing in the river are various species of trout which are stocked in the river annually by the Colorado Division of Wildlife.  The United States Forest Service maintains a series of picnic areas and campgrounds along the river, including one campground facility named for local historian Ansel Watrous, whose 1911 history of the area is the standard early reference about the canyon itself.

The canyon was inhabited by Utes in the 19th century and was the site of trapping expeditions by early settlers. The relative lack of mineral resources in the surrounding area spared the canyon from intense population increases during the Colorado mining boom (see Colorado Gold Rush). In the early 1880s, the canyon was surveyed for a railroad by archrivals, the Union Pacific Railroad and the Chicago, Burlington and Quincy Railroad, with the intention of completing a transcontinental line through the Rockies. The canyon was never the site of a railroad, however, during the 1920s a road was constructed through the narrows.

Canyons and gorges of Colorado
Landforms of Larimer County, Colorado
Rocky Mountain National Park
Roosevelt National Forest